Just Add Water (Development) Limited is an independent video game developer based in Leeds, UK. Founded by Stewart Gilray in 2006, Just Add Water has worked on different titles for the PlayStation 3 and PC, notably the Oddworld series. They have teamed up with Oddworld Inhabitants, to recreate the series in high definition as well as working on new installments in the series.

History
Just Add Water (Development), Ltd. was founded in 2006 by British career developer Stewart Gilray. The studio worked as a sub-contractor on a number of titles before moving onto its first unique project, Sony-published retro shooter Gravity Crash, in 2008. PS3 and PSP versions released in 2009/2010.

On 16 July 2010, Just Add Water announced they would start work on multiple Oddworld projects after signing a far-reaching contract with Lorne Lanning’s Oddworld Inhabitants to develop properties in the Oddworld franchise, a move Gilray describes as a "turning point" for the studio. Oddworld: Stranger’s Wrath HD, a conversion of the 2005 original, was released on 3 September 2010, updating Oddworld: Stranger's Wrath in HD with enhanced 720p visuals, more detailed character models, remastered dialogue, PlayStation Move Support and "additional bonus material."

A collection containing all four original games called the Oddbox, for Steam service was released on 20 December 2010. Both Oddworld: Munch's Oddysee and Oddworld: Stranger's Wrath made their debut on Windows PC with updates including Steamworks, which integrated new features including stats and Steam Achievements.in 2010 for PC, then a year later for PS3, and then PlayStation VITA in 2012.

Just Add Water released Oddworld: Stranger's Wrath HD for the PlayStation Network on 21 December in Europe and 28 December in North America. They have released an HD Remake of Oddworld: Munch's Oddysee HD for the PlayStation Network which was released on 19 December in Europe and on Christmas Eve 2012 in North America.

Towards the end of development on Stranger’s Wrath HD, the team moved over to start development on what would become Oddworld: New 'n' Tasty for PS4, Xbox One, PS3, VITA, PC, Mac and Linux.

Oddworld: New 'n' Tasty launched in July 2014 on PS4 to critical acclaim, with other platforms arriving in the months following. The title did well to beat its own 12 month sales prediction within 2 months of release.

One of the next new instalments is a 2D HD remake of the Abe's Oddysee game, Oddworld: New 'n' Tasty! came out in the Summer of 2014 (beating its own 12 month sales prediction within 2 months of release) and had a public showing of pre-alpha footage at Eurogamer Expo 2012. They have announced that they will complete Oddworld: Hand of Odd, which is a real-time strategy online game which was halted in the early 2000s, and it shall be released as a free-to-play title. Oddworld Inhabitants have also stated that 'Squeek's Oddysee' is in pre-production phases, with Just Add Water as the developer. In April 2015, Oddworld Inhabitants announced that an all-new remake of Oddworld: Abe's Exoddus is in the planning stages and more information about the project will be announced later.

During this time the company also revisited their title Gravity Crash, by creating a PlayStation VITA version titled Gravity Crash Ultra, which was released in August 2014.

From 2014 through to 2017 Just Add Water worked with new partners and clients, such as Paradox Interactive, Rising Star Games, Bossa Studios & Mike Bithell. This work was focused on porting various projects from PC to console, and assisting development of titles.

In 2017 Just Add Water completed work on Micro Machines World Series for Codemasters and moved into their new office in Leeds City Centre, and sought to expand their team to begin work on several new projects.

In 2018 the team grew to 25 strong and began work on titles for Outright Games and Rebellion.

In March 2019 it was announced that Just Add Water would be partnering with Rebellion to release Sniper Elite VR, a standalone VR title for the Sniper Elite series that would be released for PlayStation VR, Oculus VR and Steam VR. Later that year, in October, the release of Ice Age Scrat’s Nutty Adventure for Outright Games on PlayStation 4, Xbox One, Switch and PC occurred.

A teaser trailer for Doctor Who: The Edge of Reality was released in October 2020 by Maze Theory, with a release date for 2021.

Sniper Elite VR was released in July 2021, followed by the release of Doctor Who: The Edge of Reality in October of that same year, after a two week delay for PlayStation 4, Xbox One and PC. The Nintendo Switch version was further delayed to November.

By the end of 2021, Sniper Elite VR won a TIGA award for best VR/AR game. It was also nominated for the Game Awards in the Best VR/AR category.

On 6 January 2022, founder and CEO Stewart Gilray died from COVID-19, at the age of 51.

With a new management team in place, Just Add Water moved into new offices at Platform in Leeds in June where they are currently working on multiple projects on PC, consoles and VR.

Games

External links 

 Official website

References

2006 establishments in England
British companies established in 2006
Companies based in Leeds
Video game companies established in 2006
Privately held companies of England
Video game companies of the United Kingdom
Video game development companies